Jalan Bercham (Perak state route A183) is a major road in Perak, Malaysia.

List of junctions

Bercham